This is a list of Motorola V series mobile phones.

V60i

The V60i expanded upon the hugely popular V60 model. However, the V60i was not as popular. A common problem with this model was the antenna snapping off for no particular reason. Instead of recalling the model, Motorola introduced the V60t Color, a large improvement from its predecessor (now discontinued). Recently there have been Motorola V60i models that include a non-retractable antenna that does not tend to snap off like its predecessor.

The V60i for Verizon Wireless was also included with some Mercedes-Benz models in the mid-2000s, and integrated with the vehicle's COMAND infotainment system, as well as its telematics system. In these vehicles, the V60i included Mercedes-Benz branding.

V101 / vBox

The v101/vBox was a GSM 900/1800/1900 MHz phone, with a gray scale screen, and one of the first actual QWERTY keyboards available.   It arrived and left the world of cellphones in mid and late 2002.

V170-173

See Motorola V170

V180

The V180 is a GSM cell phone that features a clamshell design using an internal and external screen.

V188

The V188 has all the same features of the V180, however, it features improved memory capabilities and numerous add-ons in the firmware including video playback capabilities.

V190

The V190 is a clamshell phone. It has an external screen that has information such as the time, battery level, and signal status.

V195S
The V195S is a version of the V190 that was sold by T-Mobile USA; it is very similar to the V190.

V220

The V220 is an entry level camera flip-phone released in 2004. The phone features tri-band capabilities, a VGA camera with MP3 ringtones and a vibrant color screen. The phone is similar to the V300, V500 and V600, but does not have as many features as it is lower in the range.

V300

The V300 is a basic clamshell cell phone. The phone features tri-band capabilities, a VGA camera with MP3 ringtones and a vibrant color screen. The phone is similar to the V400. May be that it's manufactured for T-Mobile, but it doesn't have to be. The Motorola V330 is a variant of V300, with support for EDGE connectivity.

 Motorola V300 specifications on GSM Arena
 Motorola V300 review on CNet

V325

The V325 is a basic clamshell cell phone for Verizon Wireless and US Cellular with a large display and an outer shell that lights up during incoming calls. The V325 is an upgrade of the V265/V276, and includes a universal USB charger rather than a proprietary Motorola charger.

Introduced to the market in Q1 2006, the Motorola V325 was the first cell phone compatible with Verizon Wireless' VZ Navigator application, which provides customers with turn-by-turn, written, and spoken directions to more than 14 million points of interest in the U.S. as well as maps of their current location. Recently, VZ Navigator compatibility has been extended across much of the company's cell phone lineup.

The phone has been distributed in North America by the following carriers:
 Verizon Wireless (U.S.)
 US Cellular (U.S.)
Motorola V325 review on CNet

V360

The Motorola V360 was one of the first mobile phones with microSD/TransFlash slot, with maximum capacity of 512MB.

It suffers from problems that the Motorola V360 does not accept 2GB microSD cards, but very hard accepts 1GB microSD cards.
Motorola V360 review on CNet

V400

The V400 is a cellular mobile phone designed by Motorola which debuted in 2004. It was marketed solely by Cingular in the United States. For a phone of that year it is surprisingly advanced, with a 640x480 pixel camera amongst other features.

V551

The V551 is one of Motorola's midrange flip phone models, first released in 2004. Though midrange in price, it is highly customizable. It is a quad band phone with an integrated VGA camera, video, and Bluetooth connectivity. It sports a blue and silver exterior with a blue-lit exterior display. The related black-edged V557, released in 2005, has software upgrades unavailable to the v551.

The V330 is the same hardware as the V551 but uses a different housing. Similarly, the V540 uses the same housing except it does not have a camera.

V557

The V557 is one of Motorola's midrange fliphones and was released in 2005. Its technical specifications are very similar to those of the V551, and the V557 looks almost exactly like the V551, except that it comes in black, not blue. It also comes with a software upgrade of a "Live Ticker"—the first Motorola product to do so. The "Live Ticker" automatically downloads news and information to the desktop of the phone at no cost to the user, making it an upgrade from the V551. It also comes with a rubber-like black outer edge instead of dark blue.

Since late 2006, the Motorola V557 has been removed from Cingular's cell phone lineup. It is unknown if the higher specific absorption rate had anything to do with the device's removal.

V600

The V600 is a clamshell mobile phone made by Motorola. The V600 operates on the GSM/GPRS 850/900/1800/1900, which allows the phone to be used in almost every country.

The phone was carried in the U.S. by T-Mobile USA (the T-Mobile version had the 850 MHz band removed, but can be re-enabled via a software update or seem-editing), AT&T Wireless and Cingular. It was carried in the UK by Orange, O2 and T-Mobile.

The V600 success led Motorola to release many more handsets in a 'V-Series', including the V180, V220, V400, V500, V505, V550, as well as custom models for carriers. The direct successor of the V600 is the V620, followed by the V635. New features include video recording and menu themes.

V620

The V620 is a clamshell form factor mobile phone from manufacturer Motorola. The V620 is essentially an updated version of Motorola's flagship V600 world phone, containing such new features as video recording, menu themes and a black housing.

By current standards, the V620 has several modern features, such as the superior 262k color screen. However, the phone lacks a megapixel camera (it is equipped with a VGA camera), a popular feature of modern high-end models. Additionally, the V620 only has approximately 5.5 MB of onboard memory, and lacks a TransFlash card slot. More memory may be gained through end-user modification, though such action voids the unit's warranty. The phone also lacks a CSTN external screen, instead featuring a small inverted-color display.

The Motorola V620 was not offered through any U.S. carrier, but was popular in both the UK and Australia.

The successor of the V620 is the V635.
 Motorola V620 - Phonescoop
 Overview of Motorola V525, V620's predecessor
 Motorola V620 Review at Mobile-Review.com

V635

The V635 is a cell phone developed by Motorola. It is considered the successor to the V600 and V620 model phones. Its prominent features include the ability to insert a removable TransFlash memory card, (fully accessible through the Bluetooth) video capture and playback, 1.23-megapixel camera, and a colored external TFT display.

The phone is primarily unavailable in United States, as major US carriers do not offer the phone to their subscribers. However, phone enthusiasts in the US have been able to obtain the phone from third-party retailers. It is available from Rogers Wireless in Canada. The phone is designed to work on GSM-capable networks, and does work, without issue, on North American networks operated by companies such as T-Mobile, Cingular, Fido and Rogers Wireless. It has apparently been discontinued in at least North America.

Its functions and software are the same as MotoRAZR V3i/V3e's.

The V635 is a quad-band GSM phone, and operates at GSM/GPRS 850/900/1800/1900 bands.
 
 Motorola - V635 Product Details
 MotoDev - V635 Developer Resources

V710

The V710 is a clamshell cell phone with a large number of features. Despite its long list of features, the V710 has received mixed reviews, particularly due to poor camera quality and low battery life which were considered below expectations for a premium phone. The follow-up Motorola E815 improved significantly on the V710's shortcomings and it was well received.

The phone has been distributed in North and South America by the following carriers:
 Verizon (United States)
 U.S. Cellular  (United States)
 Alltel  (United States)
 SureWest Wireless (United States)
 TELUS (Canada)
 Vivo (Brazil)
 movistar (Colombia)
 movistar (Panama)
 Qwest  (United States)
 Golden State Cellular  (United States)
 Alaska Communications Systems (Alaska)
 Unefon (Mexico)

Criticism 

Verizon advertised this phone as having full Bluetooth capability, when in reality it had no OBEX function built in. After many complaints, a class action suit was filed for false advertising, not only for the advertising of a phone to do things it was incapable of, but also for customers complaining to Verizon and being told an update was coming out "in November."

Verizon also disables (or severely limits, depending on the firmware version) the ability to use MIDI and MP3 files, stored on the MicroSD card, as ringtones, in an effort to direct users to its own paid service, "Get It Now!." There have been similar complaints over the V710's successor, the E815, over Verizon's crippling of the phone's features in order to charge the customer more.

The basic factory model of this phone with basic Motorola firmware shipped to smaller regional carriers does not employ this lockout. Golden State Cellular marketed the phone with little defect and full Bluetooth capability. Also, there were no known issues involving the Micro SD card, allowing their customers full access to many ringtones and music files.
Motorola V710 official page (requires Flash)

V980

The V980 is a 3G/GSM clam-style cell phone developed by Motorola. This product was announced in October 2004, with product availability starting roughly in December 2004. The V980 is one of Motorola's first 3G clam phones, and while larger and heavier than comparable GSM phones, supports "next generation" services such as video calling. The V980 was designed specifically for Vodafone, although a generic version, the V975, was released at roughly the same time to support other customers.

The V980's functions include those of a camera phone, portable media player, in addition to text messaging. It also offers Internet services including e-mail and web browsing. Other features include MMS and copy/cut/paste.

The Japanese version is called Vodafone 702MO.

The candybar correspondent for the V980 is the C980, while for the V975, it's the C975.
Motorola Product Details

References

V series
Digital audio players
Portable media players